The Southern States Energy Board (SSEB) is a multi-state regional organization created by an interstate compact approved by sixteen states and two United States territories. The board is committed to promoting economic development and quality of life in the Southern United States through innovations in energy and the environment. Constituent members include Alabama, Arkansas, Florida, Georgia, Kentucky, Louisiana, Maryland, Mississippi, Missouri, North Carolina, Oklahoma, Puerto Rico, South Carolina, Tennessee, Texas, United States Virgin Islands, Virginia, and West Virginia.

Early history

The creation of the SSEB can be traced to the Southern Governors Conference meeting in Point Clear, Alabama, which on October 20, 1955 approved the "Point Clear Plan" whereby Southern states would coordinate the possible development of civilian uses of nuclear energy in the region. The agreement led to Florida Governor LeRoy Collins convening a preliminary energy conference on January 25, 1956 in Oak Ridge, Tennessee. Also attended by Tennessee Governor Frank Clement, representatives of fifteen Southern and Border states, as well as nuclear energy experts, additional meetings were held at Raleigh, North Carolina, Aiken, South Carolina and a March 1, 1956 meeting in Miami, Florida. Under the auspices of the Southern Regional Education Board (SREB), Gov. Collins convened a "Work Conference on Nuclear Energy" at Redington Beach, Florida on August 1, 1956, which urged Southern governors to create "statewide atomic energy citizens advisory committees."

These efforts resulted in the creation of a Regional Advisory Council on Nuclear Energy (RACNE), which first convened in Atlanta on February 1–2, 1957, with representatives from 14 states in attendance. Administrative support for the Council, originally provided by SREB, was transferred to the Council of State Governments' regional office.

By September 1961, with eight states having ratified a proposed interstate compact, RACNE became the "Southern Interstate Nuclear Board" (SINB), the precursor to the SSEB, which then was officially sanctioned by enactment of Public Law 87-563, filed by Tennessee Senator Albert Gore Sr. and signed into law by President John F. Kennedy on July 31, 1962.

Leaders of the Organization

Southern Interstate Nuclear Board

 Frank Norton 1961–64
 Lawrence R. Quarles 1964–66
 John B. Breckinridge 1966-67
 John J. McKetta Jr. 1967–68
 Victor S. Johnson Jr. 1968–70
 Daniel S. Eppelsheimer 1970–72
 Howard R. Drew 1972–73
 Don S. Smith 1973–74
 Peter J. Chenery 1974–75
 Pete B. Turnham 1975–78

Southern States Energy Board

 Lamar E. Priester Jr. 1978–80
 Sam Hammons 1980–81
 Gov. John Y. Brown Jr. 1981–82
 Gov. David C. Treen 1982–84
 Gov. Mark White 1984–85
 Gov. Martha Layne Collins 1985–86
 Gov. Gerald L. Baliles 1986–87
 Gov. Arch A. Moore Jr. 1987–88
 Gov. Henry Bellmon 1988–89
 Gov. Bob Martinez 1989–90
 Gov. Carroll A. Campbell Jr. 1990–91
 Gov. David Walters 1991–92
 Gov. Lawton Chiles 1992–93
 Gov. Jim Guy Tucker 1993–94
 Gov. Brereton C. Jones 1994–95
 Gov. Pedro J. Rosselló 1995–96
 Gov. Kirk Fordice 1996–97
 Gov. Cecil B. Underwood 1997–98
 Gov. Frank Keating 1998–99
 Gov. James S. Gilmore 1999–2000
 Gov. Jim Hodges 2000–01
 Gov. Ronnie Musgrove 2001–02
 Gov. Bob Wise 2002–04
 Gov. Ernie Fletcher 2004–06
 Gov. Joe Manchin, III 2006–08
 Gov. Sonny Perdue 2008–09
Gov. Joe Manchin, III 2009–10
 Gov. Robert McDonnell 2010–11
 Gov. Mary Fallin 2011–12
 Gov. Phil Bryant 2012–13
 Gov. Robert J. Bentley 2013–14
 Gov. Earl Ray Tomblin 2014–15
 Gov. Asa Hutchinson 2015–17
 Gov. Phil Bryant 2017–18
 Gov. Matt Bevin 2018–19
 Gov. Kevin Stitt 2019–21

References

Sources

Southern States Energy Board: A Golden Anniversary History of Service to the Southern Region, by Dr. Canter Brown Jr. and Kenneth J. Nemeth, Published 2010 by Southern States Energy Board, 

Economy of the Southeastern United States
Energy organizations
Energy in the United States